Hye-kyung, also spelled Hye-kyong, is a Korean feminine given name. Its meaning differs based on the hanja used to write each syllable of the name. There are 16 hanja with the reading "hye" and 54 hanja with the reading "kyung" on the South Korean government's official list of hanja which may be registered for use in given names.

People known mononymously by this name include:
Lady Hyegyeong (1735–1816), wife of Crown Prince Sado of the Joseon Dynasty

People with this name include:

Sportspeople
Lee Hye-kyung (born 1963), South Korean sport shooter
Won Hye-kyung (born 1979), South Korean short track speed skater
Kim Hye-gyong (born 1993), North Korean long-distance runner

Entertainers
Ahn Hye-kyung (안혜경, born 1979), South Korean actress
Bin Hye-kyeong (빈혜경; born 1987), South Korean model
Kim Hye-gyeong (voice actress) (김혜경; born 1987), South Korean voice actress
Park Hye-kyeong (박혜경; born 1991), South Korean singer, member of Crayon Pop
Cheeze (singer) (born Im Hye-kyung, 1991), South Korean singer, former member of the band Cheeze

Other
Lee Hye-gyeong (born 1960), South Korean writer
Hai-Kyung Suh (born 1960), South Korean classical pianist
Kim Hye-kyong (born 1968), eldest daughter of North Korean leader Kim Jong-il
Ri Hye-kyong (born ), wife of North Korean leader Kim Jong-un's brother Kim Jong-nam
Hyekyung "Shelly" Hwang, Korean American businesswoman, co-founder of frozen yogurt chain Pinkberry

See also
List of Korean given names
Hitomi Soga (born 1959), Japanese victim of North Korean kidnappings, who was given the Korean name Min Hye-gyong while living in the country

References

Korean feminine given names